National Highway 3, or NH 3, is a national highway in India. It starts from Atari adjacent to India-Pakistan border and near Amritsar and terminates at Leh in Ladakh, via Manali in Himachal Pradesh.

History
After renumbering of all national highways by National Highway Authority of India in 2010, parts of the former NH 1 and NH 70 have been combined with parts of former NH 21 to create the new NH 3.
 Attari - Jalandhar section of old NH 1. 
 Jalandhar - Mandi section of old NH 70.
 Mandi - Manali section of old NH 21.

Mountain passes

Part of national Highway 3 runs through the upper reaches of Himachal Pradesh and Ladakh, crossing some high elevation mountain passes. First major pass comes after Manali, which is Rohtang pass at an elevation of 3,978 m. Rohtang pass provides connectivity between the Kullu valley and the Lahaul and Spiti valleys of Himachal Pradesh. Next major pass on NH3 is Baralacha La at an elevation of 4,890 m in Zanskar range. In Leh district, NH 3 crosses over Nakee La (4739 m, 15547 ft), Lachulung La (5064 m, 16616 ft) and Taglang La.

Route
National Highway 3 route runs through three states. 
Punjab
Attari, Amritsar, Jalandhar, Hoshiarpur - H.P. border (178.44 km).

Himachal Pradesh
Punjab border - Gagret, Amb, Nadaun, Hamirpur, Toni Devi, Awah Devi, Sarkaghat, Kotli, Mandi, Kullu, Manali, Gramphoo, Kyelong - J & K border (208 km).

Ladakh
H.P border - Leh (170 km).

Construction and upgradation
Process for upgrading of road from two to four lanes on Jalandhar to Hoshiarpur section was started by NHAI to improve connectivity. Traffic congestion is encountered at Adampur and Rama Mandi on this 58 km stretch. 39.4 km of this project is assigned to the public works department, Punjab.

Junctions list 

 Terminal at Wagah India/Pakistan border.
  near Amritsar.
  near Amritsar.
  near Amritsar.
  near Jalandhar.
  near Jalandhar.
  near Jalandhar.
  near Hoshiarpur.
  near Hoshiarpur.
  near Mubarakpur.
  near Nadaun.
  near Hamirpur.
  near Aut.
  near Gramphoo.
  Terminal point near Leh.

Interactive map

See also
 Leh-Manali Highway
 List of National Highways in India by highway number
 National Highways Development Project

References

External links 

NH 3 on OpenStreetMap

AH1
Transport in Leh
National highways in India
National Highway 3
National Highway 3
National Highway 3
Transport in Manali, Himachal Pradesh
Transport in Amritsar